John Parkhurst (1563-1639) was an English academic  during the late 16th and early 17th centuries.

Parkhurst entered Magdalen College, Oxford in 1580.  He graduated B.A. in 1584. He was a Fellow of Magdalen from 1588 to 1603. A priest, he held livings at Shillingford, Newington and Little Wakering.He was Master of Balliol from 1617 to 1637.

Notes

1563 births
1639 deaths
18th-century English Anglican priests
Alumni of Magdalen College, Oxford
Fellows of Magdalen College, Oxford
Masters of Balliol College, Oxford